Coleophora wockeella is a moth of the family Coleophoridae. It is found from Latvia to the Iberian Peninsula, Italy and Albania and from Great Britain to southern Russia.

The wingspan is about 20 mm. Adults are ochreous with several whitish streaks on the forewing and distinctively thickened bases to the antennae. Adults are on wing from June to July in western Europe.

The larvae feed on betony (Stachys officinalis). They create a dark brown, bivalved, composite leaf case of about 10 mm long and composed of six to eight ringlets. The mouth angle is very sharp, causing the case to lie almost flat on the leaf. Larvae can be found from autumn to mid-May.

Etymology
The species was named after the German entomologist Maximilian Ferdinand Wocke.

References

wockeella
Moths described in 1849
Moths of Europe
Taxa named by Philipp Christoph Zeller